Anabar Constituency is one of the constituencies of Nauru and is made up of three districts: Anabar, Anibare, and Ijuw. It covers an area of 5.1 km², and has a population of 1,240. It returns two members to the Parliament of Nauru in Yaren.

Members of Parliament

Election results

References

External links

Constituencies of Nauru